Philip Lindeman II (October 1, 1925 – December 26, 2011), was an American Republican Party politician who served in the New Jersey General Assembly from 1960 to 1962.

Biography
He was born on October 1, 1925.

Lindeman was a 1948 graduate of Yale University and a 1951 graduate of Yale Law School.

He was elected to the Assembly in 1959, at the age of 34.  He ran for one of 12 At-Large Essex County Assembly seats.  Lindeman finished fourth in a field of 24 candidates, receiving 115,361 votes.  He sought re-election to a second term in 1961, but lost to Democrat John J. Miller, Jr. by nearly 10,000 votes.

He was a partner at the Newark law form of Hellring, Lindeman, Goldstein & Siegal, LLP before retiring to Manhattan and Nantucket.

He died on December 26, 2011 and was buried at the Prospect Hill Cemetery in Nantucket.

References

1925 births
2011 deaths
Yale Law School alumni
Republican Party members of the New Jersey General Assembly
People from Essex County, New Jersey